A highly hazardous chemical is a substance classified by the American Occupational Safety and Health Administration as material that is both toxic and reactive and whose potential for human injury is high if released. Highly hazardous chemicals may cause cancer, birth defects, induce genetic damage, cause miscarriage, injury and death from relatively small exposures.

Highly hazardous chemicals include:

External links
 OSHA list of highly hazardous chemicals

Occupational Safety and Health Administration
Chemical substances
Chemistry-related lists